Patrick S. Claridge (July 12, 1938 – March 8, 2012) was a Canadian football player who played for the BC Lions and Calgary Stampeders.

College career
Claridge lettered at Washington from 1958-60.  He was leading receiver and Most Improved Player on the 1960 team, which went 10-1 while beat Minnesota in the Rose Bowl 17-7 and was awarded the national championship by the Helms Athletic Foundation.

CFL career
He won the Grey Cup with the Lions in 1964. He played college football at the University of Washington with his brother Bruce, who also played in the CFL. He was later a businessman following his retirement from football. Claridge died of Alzheimer's disease in 2012.

References

1938 births
2012 deaths
Businesspeople from Vancouver
Canadian football ends
American football ends
Canadian players of American football
Washington Huskies football players
BC Lions players
Calgary Stampeders players
Players of Canadian football from British Columbia
Canadian football people from Vancouver